Design thinking refers to the set of cognitive, strategic and practical procedures used by designers in the process of designing, and to the body of knowledge that has been developed about how people reason when engaging with design problems.

Design thinking is also associated with prescriptions for the innovation of products and services within business and social contexts.

Background
Design thinking has a history extending from the 1950s and '60s, with roots in the study of design cognition and design methods. It has also been referred to as "designerly ways of knowing, thinking and acting" and as "designerly thinking". Many of the key concepts and aspects of design thinking have been identified through studies, across different design domains, of design cognition and design activity in both laboratory and natural contexts.

The term design thinking has been used to refer to a specific cognitive style (thinking like a designer), a general theory of design (a way of understanding how designers work), and a set of pedagogical resources (through which organisations or inexperienced designers can learn to approach complex problems in a designerly way). The different uses have given rise to some confusion in the use of the term.

As a process of designing
An iterative, non-linear process, design thinking includes activities such as context analysis, user testing, problem finding and framing, ideation and solution generating, creative thinking, sketching and drawing, prototyping, and evaluating.

Core features of design thinking include the abilities to:
 resolve ill-defined or 'wicked' problems
 adopt solution-focused strategies
 use abductive and productive reasoning
 employ non-verbal, graphic/spatial modelling media, for example, sketching and prototyping.

Wicked problems

Designing typically deals with ill-defined problems which are wickedly difficult.  Wicked problems have features such as no definitive formulation and no true/false solution. Horst Rittel introduced the term in the context of design and planning, and with Melvin Webber contrasted this problem type with well-defined or "tame" cases where the problem is clear and the solution available through applying rules or technical knowledge.

Problem framing
Rather than accept the problem as given, designers explore the given problem and its context and may re-interpret or restructure the given problem in order to reach a particular framing of the problem that suggests a route to a solution.

Solution-focused thinking
In empirical studies of three-dimensional problem solving, Bryan Lawson found architects employed solution-focused cognitive strategies, distinct from the problem-focused strategies of scientists. Nigel Cross suggests that "Designers tend to use solution conjectures as the means of developing their understanding of the problem".

Abductive reasoning
In the creation of new design proposals, designers have to infer possible solutions from the available problem information, their experience, and the use of non-deductive modes of thinking such as the use of analogies. This has been interpreted as a form of Peirce's abductive reasoning, called innovative abduction.

Co-evolution of problem and solution
In the process of designing, the designer's attention typically oscillates between their understanding of the problematic context and their ideas for a solution in a process of co-evolution of problem and solution. New solution ideas can lead to a deeper or alternative understanding of the problematic context, which in turn triggers more solution ideas.

Representations and modelling
Conventionally, designers communicate mostly in visual or object languages to translate abstract requirements into concrete objects. These 'languages' include traditional sketches and drawings but also extend to computer models and physical prototypes. The use of representations and models is closely associated with features of design thinking such as the generation and exploration of tentative solution concepts, the identification of what needs to be known about the developing concept, and the recognition of emergent features and properties within the representations.

As a process for innovation

 

A five-phase description of the design innovation process is offered by Plattner, Meinel, and Leifer as: (re)defining the problem, needfinding and benchmarking, ideating, building, and testing. Plattner, Meinel, and Leifer state: "While the stages are simple enough, the adaptive expertise required to choose the right inflection points and appropriate next stage is a high order intellectual activity that requires practice and is learnable."

The process may also be thought of as a system of overlapping spaces rather than a sequence of orderly steps: inspiration, ideation, and implementation. Projects may loop back through inspiration, ideation, and implementation more than once as the team refines its ideas and explores new directions.

Inspiration
Generally, the design innovation process starts with the inspiration phase: observing how things and people work in the real world and noticing problems or opportunities. These problem formulations can be documented in a brief which includes constraints that gives the project team a framework from which to begin, benchmarks by which they can measure progress, and a set of objectives to be realized, such as price point, available technology, and market segment.

Empathy

In their book Creative Confidence, Tom and David Kelley note the importance of empathy with clients, users, and customers as a basis for innovative design. Designers approach user research with the goal of understanding their wants and needs, what might make their life easier and more enjoyable and how technology can be useful for them. Empathic design transcends physical ergonomics to include understanding the psychological and emotional needs of people—the way they do things, why and how they think and feel about the world, and what is meaningful to them.

Ideation: divergent and convergent thinking
Ideation is idea generation. The process is characterized by the alternation of divergent and convergent thinking, typical of design thinking process.

To achieve divergent thinking, it may be important to have a diverse group of people involved in the process. Design teams typically begin with a structured brainstorming process of "thinking outside the box". Convergent thinking, on the other hand, aims for zooming and focusing on the different proposals to select the best choice, which permits continuation of the design thinking process to achieve the final goals.

After collecting and sorting many ideas, a team goes through a process of pattern finding and synthesis in which it has to translate ideas into insights that can lead to solutions or opportunities for change. These might be either visions of new product offerings, or choices among various ways of creating new experiences.

Implementation and prototyping
The third space of the design thinking innovation process is implementation, when the best ideas generated during ideation are turned into something concrete.

At the core of the implementation process is prototyping: turning ideas into actual products and services that are then tested, evaluated, iterated, and refined. A prototype, or even a rough mock-up helps to gather feedback and improve the idea. Prototypes can speed up the process of innovation because they allow quick identification of strengths and weaknesses of proposed solutions, and can prompt new ideas.

Applications 
In the 2000s and 2010s there was a significant growth of interest in applying design thinking across a range of diverse applications—for example as a catalyst for gaining competitive advantage within business or for improving education, but doubts around design thinking as a panacea for innovation have been expressed by some critics (see ).

In business

Historically, designers tended to be involved only in the later parts of the process of new product development, focusing their attention on the aesthetics and functionality of products. Many businesses and other organisations now realise the utility of embedding design as a productive asset throughout organisational policies and practices, and design thinking has been used to help many different types of business and social organisations to be more constructive and innovative. Designers bring their methods into business either by taking part themselves from the earliest stages of product and service development processes or by training others to use design methods and to build innovative thinking capabilities within organisations.

In education

All forms of professional design education can be assumed to be developing design thinking in students, even if only implicitly, but design thinking is also now explicitly taught in general as well as professional education, across all sectors of education. Design as a subject was introduced into secondary schools' educational curricula in the UK in the 1970s, gradually replacing and/or developing from some of the traditional art and craft subjects, and increasingly linked with technology studies. This development sparked related research studies in both education and design.

In the K–12 education sector, design thinking is used to enhance learning and promote creative thinking, teamwork, and student responsibility for learning. A design-based approach to teaching and learning has been developed more widely throughout education.

New courses in design thinking have also been introduced at the university level, especially when linked with business and innovation studies. A notable early course of this type was introduced at Stanford University in 2003, the Hasso Plattner Institute of Design, known as the d.school. Design thinking can now be seen in International Baccalaureate schools across the world, and in Maker Education organizations.

In computer science
Design thinking has been central to user-centered design and human-centered design—the dominant methods of designing human-computer interfaces—for over 40 years. Design thinking is also central to recent conceptions of software development in general.

Criticisms
Some of the diverse and popularized applications of design thinking, particularly in the business/innovation fields, have been criticized for promoting a very restricted interpretation of design skills and abilities. Lucy Kimbell accused business applications of design thinking of "de-politicizing managerial practice" through an "undertheorized" conception of design thinking. Lee Vinsel suggested that popular purveyors of design consulting "as a reform for all of higher education" misuse ideas from the fields that they purport to borrow from, and devalue discipline-specific expertise, giving students "'creative confidence' without actual capabilities". Natasha Iskander criticized a certain conception of design thinking for reaffirming "the privileged role of the designer" at the expense of the communities that the designer serves, and argued that the concept of "empathy" employed in some formulations of design thinking ignores critical reflection on the way identity and power shape empathetic identification. She claimed that promoting simplified versions of design thinking "makes it hard to solve challenges that are characterized by a high degree of uncertainty—like climate change—where doing things the way we always have done them is a sure recipe for disaster".

History
Drawing on psychological studies of creativity from the 1940s, such as  Max Wertheimer's "Productive Thinking" (1945), new creativity techniques in the 1950s and design methods in the 1960s led to the idea of design thinking as a particular approach to creatively solving problems. Among the first authors to write about design thinking were John E. Arnold in "Creative Engineering" (1959) and L. Bruce Archer in "Systematic Method for Designers" (1965).

In his book "Creative Engineering" (1959) Arnold distinguishes four areas of design thinking: (1) novel functionality, i.e. solutions that satisfy a novel need or solutions that satisfy an old need in an entirely new way, (2) higher performance levels of a solution, (3) lower production costs or (4) increased salability. Arnold recommended a balanced approach—product developers should seek opportunities in all four areas of design thinking: "It is rather interesting to look over the developmental history of any product or family of products and try to classify the changes into one of the four areas ... Your group, too, might have gotten into a rut and is inadvertently doing all of your design thinking in one area and is missing good bets in other areas."

Although L. Bruce Archer's "Systematic Method for Designers" (1965) was concerned primarily with a systematic process of designing, it also expressed a need to broaden the scope of conventional design: "Ways have had to be found to incorporate knowledge of ergonomics, cybernetics, marketing and management science into design thinking". Archer was also developing the relationship of design thinking with management: "The time is rapidly approaching when design decision making and management decision making techniques will have so much in common that the one will become no more than the extension of the other".

Arnold initiated a long history of design thinking at Stanford University, extending through many others such as Robert McKim and Rolfe Faste, who taught "design thinking as a method of creative action", and continuing with the shift from creative engineering to innovation management in the 2000s. Design thinking was adapted for business purposes by Faste's Stanford colleague David M. Kelley, who founded the design consultancy IDEO in 1991.

Bryan Lawson's 1980 book How Designers Think, primarily addressing design in architecture, began a process of generalising the concept of design thinking. A 1982 article by Nigel Cross, "Designerly Ways of Knowing", established some of the intrinsic qualities and abilities of design thinking that also made it relevant in general education and thus for wider audiences. Peter Rowe's 1987 book Design Thinking, which described methods and approaches used by architects and urban planners, was a significant early usage of the term in the design research literature. An international series of research symposia in design thinking began at Delft University of Technology in 1991. Richard Buchanan's 1992 article "Wicked Problems in Design Thinking" expressed a broader view of design thinking as addressing intractable human concerns through design, reprising ideas that Rittel and Webber developed in the early 1970s.

Timeline

See also 

 Creativity techniques
 Lateral thinking
 Reflective practice
 Systems thinking
 User experience

Lists
 List of thought processes
 List of creative thought processes

References

Further reading

 Brooks, Frederick. The Design of Design. Boston, MA: Addison-Wesley, Pearson Education, 2010.
 Curedale, Robert. Design Thinking Process and Methods. 5th Edition. Design Community College Press, CA, 2019 
 Kelly, Tom. Ten Faces of Innovation. London: Profile, 2006.
 Lawson, Bryan. Design in Mind. Oxford, UK: Butterworth, 1994.
 Lewrick, Michael, Patrick Link, Larry Leifer. The Design Thinking Playbook. Hoboken, NJ: Wiley, 2018.
 Liedtka, Jeanne. Designing for Growth: A Design Thinking Tool Kit For Managers. New York: Columbia University Press, 2011. 
 Liedtka, Jeanne. Solving Problems with Design Thinking: Ten Stories of What Works. New York: Columbia University Press, 2013. 
 Lupton, Ellen. Graphic Design Thinking: Beyond Brainstorming. New York: Princeton Architectural Press, 2011. .
 Martin, Roger L. The Design of Business: Why Design Thinking is the Next Competitive Advantage. Cambridge, MA: Harvard Business Press, 2009.
 Mootee, Idris. Design Thinking for Strategic Innovation. Hoboken, NJ: Wiley, 2013.
 Nelson, George. How to See: a Guide to Reading Our Man-made Environment. San Francisco, CA: Design Within Reach, 2006.
 Schön, Donald. Educating the Reflective Practitioner. San Francisco: Jossey-Bass, 1987.

Design